La folle histoire de Max et Léon is a 2016 French World War II comedy film directed by Jonathan Barré, written by Barré, and the two stars of the film, the comedy team of Grégoire Ludig, and David Marsais.  The film was produced by Alain Goldman and Christopher Lambert who has a cameo as a French Army Captain.

Plot
The war has broken out and Max and Leo have to commit themselves, like thousands of young people in 1939. And if at first they do not realize the consequences of such a mission, they will soon discover that war Is not a matter to be taken lightly. And when defeat strikes, it's even less pleasing. Max and Leon have only one idea in mind: to go home as soon as possible and at all costs. But it is not counting the forces and the men who are in command and who do not intend to let them go like that.

During the Battle of France the pair impersonate Germans and later two French Captains that lead them to England where they join the Free French Forces.  The pair are sent as secret agents to the French Mandate for Syria and the Lebanon that leads them to be captured and returned to Occupied France.  After meeting several of their old comrades in arms including their sergeant who has turned traitor they escape to Vichy France working for simultaneously for the French Forces of the Interior and the Vichy Ministry of Propaganda after the German Occupation of Vichy.

Reception
Les Inrockuptibles reviewed the film, the first feature film from comedy duo Palmashow, as an "ambitious but alas weak transfer to the big screen."

Cast

 David Marsais as Max
 Grégoire Ludig as Léon
 Alice Vial as Alice Marchal
 Saskia de Melo Dillais as Sarah
 Dominique Pinon as Michel
 Bernard Farcy as Célestin
 Catherine Hosmalin as Madame Dormeuil
 Julien Pestel as Pichon
 Nicolas Maury as Eugène
 Nicolas Marié as Colonel Marchal
 Christopher Lambert as Captain Lassard
 Kyan Khojandi as Commandant Poulain
 Jonathan Cohen as Commandant Beaulieu
 Baptiste Lecaplain as A soldier
 Kad Merad as The actor
 Pascale Arbillot as The actress
 Florence Foresti as A resistant
 Alban Lenoir as A resistant
 Simon Astier as A resistant
 Dominique Besnehard as The medecin
 Philippe Duquesne as The railroader
 Fatsah Bouyahmed as Billal
 Bruno Wolkowitch as The fatalist

References

External links

2016 films
2010s war comedy films
French war comedy films
2010s French-language films
World War II prisoner of war films
Military humor in film
Films about the French Resistance
Films set in Syria
2016 comedy films
2010s French films